Abisares viridipennis is a species of short-horned grasshopper in the family Acrididae, found in the Afrotropics.

Subspecies
These subspecies belong to the species Abisares viridipennis:
 Abisares viridipennis dromedarius (Rehn, 1914)
 Abisares viridipennis hylaeus (Rehn, 1914)
 Abisares viridipennis viridipennis (Burmeister, 1838)

References

External links

 

Catantopinae